In finance, a secured transaction is a loan or a credit transaction in which the lender acquires a security interest in collateral owned by the borrower and is entitled to foreclose on or repossess the collateral in the event of the borrower's default. The terms of the relationship are governed by a contract, or security agreement. A common example would be a consumer who purchases a car on credit. If the consumer fails to make the payments on time, the lender will take the car and resell it, applying the proceeds of the sale toward the loan. Mortgages and deeds of trust are another example. In the United States, secured transactions in personal property (that is, anything other than real property) are governed by Article 9 of the Uniform Commercial Code (U.C.C.).

The law treats differently those creditors who are secured (i.e. have an authenticated, perfected security interest) from those creditors who are unsecured. An unsecured creditor is simply a person who is owed money and has not received payment according to the terms of the agreed upon transaction. Upon default of a debtor who has multiple creditors, the distinction between being a secured creditor and an unsecured creditor is legally significant. The secured creditor will generally always have priority to getting his money before the unsecured creditors do. In other words, the unsecured creditor is at the back of the line of priority – his only remedy is to obtain a judgment from the court for the amount of the defaulted loan.

The following example is given:

A debtor borrows $10,000 from a car dealership to purchase an automobile, using the automobile itself as collateral for the loan (in other words the dealership retains a right to repossess the automobile in the event the debtor defaults on the loan). The dealership makes this loan using an authenticated security agreement – a signed agreement giving the dealership the secured right to repossess the car in the event of default of the debtor. The debtor also has two unsecured creditors who have made loans of $1000 each to the debtor. Neither of these creditors has a security agreement – their only method of recovering their money in the event that the debtor defaults on the loan is through the judicial system, whereas the secured creditor can simply repossess the car at his option (This is called self-help repossession and is completely legal provided the secured creditor does not breach the peace in doing so). The debtor is in debt $10K to the secured creditor and $2000 to the unsecured creditors. Assume the debtor defaults and his only asset is the automobile. The dealership can repossess the auto and sell it to satisfy its debt.  Two things can happen here: 1) The dealership sells the collateral (car) for more than the amount of the debt (let's say $15K). In this case, the debtor would receive the excess $5K (surplus) which he would use to satisfy the debts of his unsecured creditors (and then would have $3K left over). 2) The dealership repossess the car and sells it for less than the amount of the debt, let's say $9K (more likely scenario). In this case, the secured creditor dealership keeps the $9K, and the remaining $1K (deficiency) that the dealership is owed becomes unsecured – it is on the same level of priority as the other two unsecured loans. Those three unsecured claims of $1K each will be paid off equally. Thus, if the debtor has $1500 to satisfy its debts – each unsecured creditor would get $500 (1/3 of amount each). The remaining debt will probably never be repaid because, in cases such as these with the debtor having multiple loans on default, the debtor has most likely filed for Ch. 7 Bankruptcy.

It is crucial, if you are a lender, to have a security agreement in collateral that you are confident is worth at least as much as the amount of the loan you made to the debtor. If not, your deficiency in that amount is unsecured. In the previous example – the dealership loaned $10K on a car that had a fair market value of only $9K. Thus, they were deficient $1K which becomes unsecured. To perfect a security agreement, the filing of a public notice is usually required. See §§ 9-302 – 9-305 of the code.

See also 
 Secured transactions in the United States
 Security interest
 Chattel mortgage

References

Contract law